

The following lists events that happened during 1942 in Afghanistan.

Incumbents
 Monarch – Mohammed Zahir Shah
 Prime Minister – Mohammad Hashim Khan

June 1942
Diplomatic relations with the United States are opened.

July 1942
The king again reaffirms his country's policy of neutrality "provided Afghanistan is left unmolested."

November 26, 1942
The 9-year-old crown prince, Mohammad Akbar Khan, dies.

 
Afghanistan
Years of the 20th century in Afghanistan
Afghanistan
1940s in Afghanistan